Tawny Weber is an American romantic fiction writer.  Her books are published by Harlequin Blaze.  Born in Idaho, she now lives in Northern California.

Biography
Weber was born in Idaho.  She has worked in a Las Vegas talent agency, was a tarot reader, intuitive healer, and a metaphysical hypnotherapist, focusing on past lives, inner child work, and healing energy.  In 2005, she was a winner in the Harlequin Blaze Challenge.  She has also been a multi-finalist for the Romance Writers of America Golden Heart Award, given to unpublished authors.

Her first novel, Double Dare, was published by Harlequin Blaze in May 2007. She’s the past President of the Black Diamonds Romance Writers of America and previous VP of Administration of the SFA-RWA (San Francisco Area Romance Writers of America).

She lives in Northern California with her husband and two daughters.

Bibliography
Double Dare – 2007
Does She Dare? – 2008
Risqué Business – 2008
Coming On Strong – April 2009
Going Down Hard – May 2009
Feels Like The First Time – September 2009
You Have to Kiss a Lot of Frogs – Blazing Bedtime Stories volume III – January 2010
Riding the Waves – September 2010
Babe in Toyland – Must Have Been the Mistletoe Christmas Anthology – December 2010
Breaking the Rules – February 2011
Just For The Night – May 2011
Sex, Lies and Mistletoe – December 2011
Sex, Lies and Midnight – January 2012
Sex, Lies and Valentines – February 2012
Wild Thing - Blazing Bedtime Stories volume VII – June 2012

Awards
 Harlequin Blaze Challenge Winner 2005
 CataRomance 2007 Best Book of the Year for Category for Double Dare
 CataRomance 2007 Best Book of the Year for Harlequin Blaze for Double Dare

References and resources

Tawny Weber Official Website
From the Heart Interview
The Call Interview by Kelly St. John
Romance Diva Interview

External links
Tawny Weber Official Website

21st-century American novelists
American romantic fiction writers
American women novelists
Living people
21st-century American women writers
Year of birth missing (living people)